Church of St. Stephen is a former Roman Catholic church in Naujamiestis, Vilnius. It was completed in 1612 and previously was used by the Brotherhood of Saint Roch, but now stands in a warehouses yard and is hard to reach for visitors. It was restored from a very poor condition.

References

 

Roman Catholic churches completed in 1612
17th-century Roman Catholic church buildings in Lithuania
Renaissance architecture in Lithuania
Roman Catholic churches in Vilnius
1612 establishments in the Polish–Lithuanian Commonwealth